Georg Christoph Martini or Giorgio Cristoforo Martini, also called il Sassone (the Saxon) (died 21 December 1745) was a German-Italian painter, engraver, travel writer, archeologist, and antiquarian.

Biography
He was born in Bad Langensalza in then Saxony. he came to Lucca to learn painting. He served as a secretary for the Ambassador from Lucca to Vienna, Carol Mansi during 1736-1742. Among his pupils in 1725 was Giuseppe Antonio Luchi. He wrote in German three volumes of In italia (1721-1745). He described and illustrated many Roman and Etruscan antiquities found in the region of Lucca. He also had an eye to natural landscapes and flora and fauna.

While he died in Lucca, he was buried in the first Dutch-German cemetery in Livorno, known as the "Dutch Garden", which he had visited in 1725 and describes in his travel journal. This cemetery was dismantled in 1924, the remains and headstones being transferred to the current Dutch-German cemetery in Via Mastacchi. He had no wife or heirs.

References

Year of birth unknown
1745 deaths
People from Bad Langensalza
Archaeologists from Thuringia
German antiquarians
German male non-fiction writers
18th-century Italian painters
Italian male painters
18th-century German painters
18th-century German male artists
German male painters
18th-century travel writers
Italian travel writers
Artists from Thuringia
18th-century Italian male artists